Peter R. Bell (born 14 October 1954) is a former Australian rules footballer in the VFL.

A half-forward flanker from East Sandringham, Victoria, he debuted in 1973 with the St Kilda Football Club, and his 188 cm frame was reliable in marking contests. Bell played 33 games and booted 33 goals for St Kilda, before moving to the VFA in 1978 to play for Sandringham Football Club.

References

External links
 

1954 births
Living people
St Kilda Football Club players
Sandringham Football Club players
Australian rules footballers from Victoria (Australia)